Jean-Marie Touratier (1943 – 1 February 2021) was a French writer, author, and artistic director.

Biography
Touratier earned an agrégation in modern literature and subsequently became the director of the Fonds régional d'art contemporain in Toulouse and arranged multiple art exhibitions. In addition to his career as an artistic director, he wrote a number of books about different works of art.

Jean-Marie Touratier died in Paris on 1 February 2021 at the age of 77 from COVID-19.

Works
T.V. Essai sur la représentation et la communication (1978)
Farce (1979)
Le Stéréotype. Et comment s'en servir (1979)
Autoportraits avec ruines (1980)
Le Mal de Seine (1980)
Au bord des fleuves de Babylone (1982)
Vie et légende du captain Sarkis (1986)
Manuel pratique d'art contemporain (1987)
Moi, le dernier des enfants d'Occident & autres textes (1991)
Bois rouge (1993)
Le Caravage. Fragments d'une vie violente (1997)
L’œuvre ultime. Giovanni Cosma (1999)
La Belle Déception du regard. Réflexions sur l’art contemporain (2001)
Martha se tait (2003)
Déjà la nuit. Claude Monet (2005)
La Cicatrice (2007)
Être humain, tome I, Carl Th. Dreyer, Ingmar Bergman (2009)
Être humain, tome II, Yasujiro Ozu, Andreï Tarkovski (2009)
Géricault, cheval-peintre (2012)
Pauvre Joconde (2013)
"Les Venimeux" (2015)
Mauvais sang (2018)
Le légendaire de Marcel Duchamp (2020)

References

French writers
1943 births
2021 deaths
Deaths from the COVID-19 pandemic in France